Milagritos Gorriti (born 25 September 1973) is a Peruvian table tennis player. She competed in the women's doubles event at the 1996 Summer Olympics.

References

1973 births
Living people
Peruvian female table tennis players
Olympic table tennis players of Peru
Table tennis players at the 1996 Summer Olympics
Place of birth missing (living people)
20th-century Peruvian women